General Sir Geoffrey Randolph Dixon Musson,  (9 June 1910 – 10 January 2008) was a senior British Army officer who served during the Second World War and the Korean War and later became Adjutant-General to the Forces in the late 1960s.

Military career
Educated at Shrewsbury School and at Trinity Hall, Cambridge, Geoffrey Musson was commissioned into the King's Shropshire Light Infantry in 1930. During the Second World War he served in North Africa and Italy. He was Commanding Officer of the 2nd Duke of Cornwall's Light Infantry from 1943 to 1944 and commander of the 36th Infantry Brigade from 1944 to 1946. He was awarded the Distinguished Service Order in May 1944 for making an assault crossing of the Gari River, establishing a bridgehead on the far bank, covering the construction of ferries to allow the rest of the brigade to cross and then securing an important vantage point overlooking Monte Cassino.

Musson commanded the Commonwealth Forces in Korea from 1954 to 1955, and in 1956 he became commandant of the Infantry Training Centre. In 1958 he was appointed General Officer Commanding 7th Armoured Division, going on to be General Officer Commanding 5th Division later that year. He then served as Chief of Staff of Middle East Land Forces from 1959 to 1962. He became Commander-in-Chief Northern Command in 1964, and Adjutant General in 1967. He retired from the British Army in 1970.

Musson was Colonel Commandant of the King's Shropshire Light Infantry from 1963 to 1968 and Colonel Commandant of The Light Infantry from 1968 to 1972. He lived in Hurstbourne Tarrant near Andover, Hampshire.

Musson was appointed a Companion of the Order of the Bath in 1959, a Knight Commander of the Order of the Bath in 1965 and a Knight Grand Cross of the Order of the Bath in 1970. He was also appointed a Commander of the Order of the British Empire in 1945.

In retirement Musson was vice-chairman of the National Savings Committee.

Family
In 1939 Musson married Elspeth Lorraine and together they went on to have one son and one daughter.

References

External links
Generals of World War II

|-

|-
 

|-
 

1910 births
2008 deaths
Alumni of Trinity Hall, Cambridge
British Army generals
British Army brigadiers of World War II
Commanders of the Order of the British Empire
Companions of the Distinguished Service Order
King's Shropshire Light Infantry officers
Knights Grand Cross of the Order of the Bath
People educated at Shrewsbury School
British Army personnel of the Korean War
Military personnel from Shropshire